Interstate 695 (I-695) is a  auxiliary Interstate Highway that is a full beltway extending around Baltimore, Maryland, United States. I-695 is officially designated the McKeldin Beltway but is colloquially referred to as either the Baltimore Beltway or 695. The route is an auxiliary route of I-95, intersecting that route southwest of Baltimore near Arbutus and northeast of the city near White Marsh. It also intersects other major roads radiating from the Baltimore area, including I-97 near Glen Burnie, the Baltimore–Washington Parkway (B–W Parkway; Maryland Route 295 [MD 295]) near Linthicum, I-70 near Woodlawn, I-795 near Pikesville, and I-83 in the Timonium area. The  portion of the Baltimore Beltway between I-95 northeast of Baltimore and I-97 south of Baltimore is officially Maryland Route 695 (MD 695) and is not part of the Interstate Highway System but is signed as I-695. This section of the route includes the Francis Scott Key Bridge that crosses over the Patapsco River. The bridge and its approaches are maintained by the Maryland Transportation Authority (MDTA) while the remainder of the Baltimore Beltway is maintained by the Maryland State Highway Administration (MDSHA).

The Baltimore Beltway was first planned in 1949 by Baltimore County; the state eventually took over the project and it became part of the Interstate Highway System planned in 1956. The length of the route from MD 2 south of Baltimore clockwise to U.S. Route 40 (US 40) northeast of the city opened in stages from 1955 to 1962, providing an Interstate bypass of Baltimore. It was the first beltway in the US to be built as part of the Interstate Highway System. Plans were made to finish the remainder of the route, with a diversion to the Windlass and Patapsco freeways, opened in 1973, following the cancelation of a more outer route that was to partly follow what is today MD 702 (Southeast Boulevard). The Outer Harbor Crossing over the Patapsco River, which was dedicated to Francis Scott Key, who wrote "The Star-Spangled Banner", and its approaches were finished in 1977, completing the route around Baltimore. The approaches to the bridge were originally two lanes to accommodate a tunnel that was originally proposed to run under the river; in subsequent years, they were upgraded to a four-lane configuration compliant with Interstate Highway standards, allowing for this portion of route to be signed as I-695 rather than MD 695. There are future plans for I-695 that include high-occupancy toll (HOT) lanes to ease traffic. In addition, the northeastern interchange with I-95 has been reconstructed in 2014 to accommodate express toll lanes that were added to I-95, and construction took place in 2016 to remove I-695's carriageway crossovers here.

Route description

Curtis Creek to I-95
Starting at the zero milepost in Baltimore, I-695, which at this point is officially called MD 695 and is maintained by the MDTA, is four lanes wide. The route passes over Curtis Creek on a pair of drawbridges here, which have  of vertical navigational clearance and provide access for tall ships to a US Coast Guard base further upstream. Continuing west through industrial areas into Anne Arundel County, the route encounters the northern terminus of MD 10 (Arundel Expressway) at a directional interchange, where maintenance switches to MDSHA. The interchange includes access to the next interchange, with MD 2 (Ritchie Highway), a major north–south route between Baltimore and the southern suburbs, in Glen Burnie. This interchange has access to northbound MD 2 in both directions and from northbound MD 2 to the westbound direction. Beyond MD 2, I-695 encounters I-895B, a short connector to I-895 (Harbor Tunnel Thruway); this interchange provides access to southbound MD 2 from both directions and to the eastbound direction from southbound MD 2. Immediately past this interchange, I-695 comes to an interchange with the northern terminus of I-97, which terminates on the Beltway. At this point, the route officially becomes I-695.

The route continues west as a six-lane freeway, heading west into residential areas of Linthicum.  It interchanges with MD 648 (Baltimore Annapolis Boulevard), where 132,330 vehicles travel I-695 every day, before turning northwest and intersecting MD 170 (Camp Meade Road) and passing over the Maryland Transit Administration (MTA)'s Baltimore Light RailLink. The route encounters the B–W Parkway (MD 295) at a cloverleaf interchange where the route's signage changes from east–west to north–south at this interchange. It turns more to the north from here and heads into commercial areas, interchanging with MD 168 (Nursery Road) and Hammonds Ferry Road. Past this interchange, the route crosses the Patapsco River into Baltimore County and soon encounters a partial interchange with I-895 (Harbor Tunnel Thruway) with access only from the southbound direction of I-695 to I-895 northbound and from I-895 southbound to the northbound direction of I-695. Past this interchange, I-695 heads north, interchanging with Hollins Ferry Road in Lansdowne before passing under CSX Transportation's Baltimore Terminal Subdivision and coming to an interchange with US 1 Alternate (US 1 Alt.; Washington Boulevard) in Arbutus. A short distance later, I-695 comes to a semidirectional interchange with I-95.

I-95 to I-70

I-695 widens to nine lanes past interchange with I-95, with five lanes in the southbound direction and four lanes in the northbound direction. Running northwest, it crosses over Amtrak's Northeast Corridor and comes to a partial interchange with US 1 (Southwestern Boulevard), with a southbound exit and northbound entrance. From here, it continues northwest through residential areas of Catonsville to an interchange with MD 372 (Wilkens Avenue). Narrowing to eight lanes total, with four lanes in each direction, beyond MD 372, the route continues through suburban neighborhoods before coming to an interchange with MD 144 (Frederick Road). At this point, I-695 narrows to seven lanes, with three southbound lanes and four northbound lanes. It continues north and interchanges with Edmondson Avenue before turning northwest and intersecting US 40 (Baltimore National Pike) near the defunct Westview Mall, now a big-box complex. Beyond US 40, I-695 continues north through residential areas, narrowing to six lanes, with three lanes in each direction, before coming to a four-level stack interchange with I-70 in Woodlawn.

I-70 to I-83

The Baltimore Beltway narrows from seven to six lanes within the interchange, which contains braided ramps providing access to the next interchange, MD 122 (Security Boulevard), located near Security Square Mall and the headquarters of the Social Security Administration. Continuing north, the road widens to eight lanes again and continues through a mix of suburban homes and business parks in Lochearn. I-695 interchanges with MD 26 (Liberty Road) east of Randallstown and resumes north, narrowing to six lanes. It intersects the southern terminus of I-795 (Northwest Expressway), which serves as a bypass of MD 140 in the Owings Mills area. The MTA's Baltimore Metro SubwayLink line to Owings Mills passes under I-695 within the interchange and runs in the median of I-795 as far as that town. At the I-795 interchange, the signage of route changes from north–south to east–west.

From here, I-695 heads northeast as an eight lane road and enters Pikesville, where it passes under CSX Transportation's Hanover Subdivision and intersects MD 140 (Reisterstown Road) at a single-point urban interchange. A short distance later, the road comes to a partial interchange with MD 129 (Park Heights Avenue), with an eastbound exit and westbound entrance. I-695 heads east to another partial interchange with Stevenson Road, which has a westbound exit and eastbound entrance. The Baltimore Beltway passes through heavily forested land as it encounters Greenspring Avenue. Past this interchange, I-695 continues northeast through woodland before coming to an interchange with I-83 (Jones Falls Expressway). The interchange includes connections to MD 25 (Falls Road), which heads into the open countryside north of Baltimore. Within this interchange, I-83 forms a concurrency with I-695 and the roadway widens to 10 lanes, with six for the Beltway and four for I-83. After running concurrently, I-83 splits from I-695 by heading north on the Harrisburg Expressway at a directional interchange.

I-83 to I-95

Beyond I-83, I-695 passes over the MTA's Baltimore Light RailLink and turns southeast as a six lane road, heading into Towson. Here, the road comes to an interchange with MD 139 (Charles Street). The Baltimore Beltway heads through residential and commercial areas before coming to interchanges with MD 45 (York Road) near The Shops at Kenilworth and MD 146 (Dulaney Valley Road). Continuing east, the Baltimore Beltway passes to the north of Goucher College and comes to an interchange with Providence Road. I-695 turns southeast through residential areas past Providence Road and comes to an interchange with MD 542 (Loch Raven Boulevard) and Cromwell Bridge Road. The road continues toward Parkville, where it comes to a cloverleaf interchange with MD 41 (Perring Parkway) within commercial areas. The Baltimore Beltway continues through residential areas into Carney, coming to another cloverleaf interchange with MD 147 (Harford Road). Continuing east into White Marsh, the route encounters the western terminus of MD 43 (White Marsh Boulevard), a limited-access at-grade boulevard that provides access to White Marsh Mall, US 1 and I-95.

I-695 turns south past MD 43 and interchanges with US 1 (Belair Road) south of White Marsh. The road continues southeast to an interchange with I-95 (John F. Kennedy Memorial Highway) a short distance after US 1 in Rossville. This interchange with I-95 (to east of Baltimore city) is a fully directional interchange where the carriageways of both routes crossed over each other onto the opposite side, then crossed over each other again; at the site of each crossover, left-hand entrance and exit ramps were provided to eliminate the need for directional flyovers. In 2008, interchange reconstruction at the I-95 interchange removed the left-hand entrance from northbound I-95 to westbound I-695 with the remaining left-hand entrances to be removed by August 2009 as part of the construction of the I-95 Express Toll Lane Project; all exits and entrances were now on the right, and I-95's opposing roadways no longer crossed each other (but I-695's still did).

I-95 to Curtis Creek

Continuing south, the Baltimore Beltway officially becomes MD 695 again, despite being signed as I-695, and soon encounters MD 7 (Philadelphia Road). Between I-95 and MD 7, the route's changes from east–west to north–south. Immediately after MD 7, the route interchanges with US 40 (Pulaski Highway) northwest of Essex near The Centre at Golden Ring. After US 40, I-695 crosses over CSX Transportation's Philadelphia Subdivision and comes to a partial directional interchange with MD 702 (Southeast Boulevard). At this interchange, I-695 turns south onto the Windlass Freeway, crossing over the Northeast Corridor again within the interchange.

Running south along the Windlass Freeway, parallel to the Northeast Corridor, I-695, now narrowed to four lanes, turns west before making a sharp turn to the south, crossing over the railroad line twice. The road becomes the Patapsco Freeway and continues south to an interchange with MD 150 (Eastern Avenue) and MD 157 (Merritt Boulevard) near Eastpoint Mall. A short distance later, I-695 comes to an interchange with MD 151 (North Point Boulevard). From here, the route continues southeast along the Back River into residential and industrial Dundalk, interchanging with Cove Road. The route turns south, with the median briefly widening to include trees, before coming to another interchange with MD 151. Past MD 151, the Baltimore Beltway continues southwest through industrial areas, with maintenance switching to the MDTA at the crossing of a CSX Transportation rail line. It comes to an interchange with MD 157 (Peninsula Expressway) and MD 158 (Bethlehem Boulevard) before heading west. The route runs past Tradepoint Atlantic before crossing over Bear Creek and interchanging with unsigned MD 695A (Broening Highway) south of the Dundalk Marine Terminal, with an eastbound exit and westbound entrance.

Beyond this interchange, the route comes to a two-way all-electronic toll gantry and has a U-turn ramp from the southbound direction to the northbound direction intended to provide southbound motorists access to MD 695A. This ramp, known as MD 695C, also provides access to northbound I-695 from MD 695A by way of Authority Drive. After this, the route ascends onto the Francis Scott Key Bridge, which carries I-695 over the lower Baltimore Harbor and Patapsco River. Unlike the Fort McHenry or Baltimore Harbor tunnels, hazmat trucks are allowed to cross the Francis Scott Key Bridge. After crossing the Patapsco River over the bridge the route touches down within the Baltimore city limits and continues west past Thoms Cove through Hawkins Point's industrial areas. It comes to an interchange with Quarantine Road, which provides access to MD 173, south of Curtis Bay. By this point, the route's signage changes from north–south to east–west. Past this interchange, the Baltimore Beltway continues west and returns to the Curtis Creek drawbridges.

Exit numbering
As opposed to I-495 (Capital Beltway) around Washington DC, on which exit numbers are generally arranged by mileposts counterclockwise starting at the southern crossing of the Potomac River, the exit numbers for the Baltimore Beltway are arranged consecutively clockwise starting at interchange 1 at Quarantine Road, west of the Francis Scott Key Bridge crossing of the Patapsco River.

History

The Baltimore County Planning Commission first conceived the Baltimore Beltway as a county-level roadway project in 1949; by 1953, the project was taken over by the state due to slow progress at the county level. The project was included as part of the Interstate Highway System by 1956, increasing the speed of construction due to federal funds available.

The first part of the Baltimore Beltway to be completed was in December 1955 between MD 25 (Falls Road) and the Harrisburg Expressway (present-day I-83). In 1956, the next portion of the road between the Harrisburg Expressway and MD 45 (York Road) opened. Several more segments of the Baltimore Beltway would be built in the following years, with the section from MD 168 (Nursery Road) to the Glen Burnie Bypass (present-day I-97) opening in 1957; the portions from MD 45 to MD 542 (Loch Raven Boulevard), MD 7 (Old Philadelphia Road) to US 40 (Pulaski Highway), and from MD 168 to US 40 (Baltimore National Pike) opening in 1958; the segment from MD 2 (Ritchie Highway) to the Glen Burnie Bypass completed in 1960; the portion from US 1 (Belair Road) to MD 7 finished in 1961; and the portions from MD 542 to US 1 and from US 40 to MD 25 finished in 1962. At this time, the original length of the Baltimore Beltway, from MD 2 in the south clockwise to US 40 in the northeast, was fully completed and opened to traffic, providing the first Interstate-grade bypass of Baltimore and the first beltway in the US built under the Interstate Highway System. A segment of the road completed in 1973 ran from MD 10 to MD 2, heading toward the Outer Harbor Crossing.

From the junction with I-95, the Baltimore Beltway was planned to extend southeast along the Back River Neck peninsula, turning south to cross the Back River near the Essex Skypark Airport, then heading towards the present Outer Harbor Crossing. Part of this alignment was completed as I-695 to south of US 40 in 1972, then as MD 702 (Southeast Freeway) extending to MD 150 by 1975. However, the section of the Baltimore Beltway between south of MD 150 to west of the Fall River crossing was not built, requiring it be rerouted on portions of two freeways not originally planned to be part of it.

The first was the Windlass Freeway (MD 149), a route planned to run from I-95 at Moravia Road northeast to Chase, paralleling US 40 to the south. From here, the Windlass Freeway would have continued to its southerly terminus at I-95. This sharp turn is half of what would have been another directional T interchange, marking the northern terminus of the Patapsco Freeway, the other freeway incorporated into the Baltimore Beltway. 

The Patapsco Freeway was planned to connect the Windlass Freeway to the originally-planned Baltimore Beltway. Completed in 1973, the entirety of the planned Patapsco Freeway is now part of I-695. The wide median in I-695 south of exit 41 (Cove Road) is where the unbuilt beltway would have intersected the Patapsco Freeway, after crossing Fall River to the east, making this the southern terminus of the Patapsco Freeway. Continuing southeast, I-695 rejoins the original alignment of the beltway.

Ramp stubs for the planned Windlass Freeway are present at the proposed west end at I-95 and Moravia Road, and, at the present west end at the Southeast Freeway (MD 702), the partially built junction with the proposed Windlass Freeway. The planned junction of the Windlass and Patapsco freeways, now the point where I-695 makes a sharp turn from west to south, just to the north of where it crosses the Fall River, was originally built with provisions for extending the Windlass Freeway to I-95, but this has since been reconfigured as a sharp curve on I-695.

The Outer Harbor Crossing is the name given to the segment of the Baltimore Beltway maintained by the MDTA. It consists of the segment of I-695 between exit 40 (MD 151) and exit 2 (MD 10), which includes the Francis Scott Key Bridge. The route was originally planned as a two-lane freeway on a four-lane right-of-way, with a two-lane outer harbor tunnel across the Patapsco River. When the tunnel was advertised for construction in 1970, the bids were so high that the decision was made to construct a four-lane bridge instead. The bridge was to feature two-lane approach roads on both sides.

Construction on the Outer Harbor Crossing, including the bridge, started in 1972 and was opened on March 23, 1977, completing the full Baltimore Beltway. The bridge was named the Francis Scott Key Bridge in honor of Francis Scott Key, who wrote "The Star-Spangled Banner", the national anthem of the US. By the early 1980s, the southern approach to the Francis Scott Key Bridge was dualized, with a second roadway constructed along with a second drawbridge over Curtis Creek. The northern approach was left as a two-lane viaduct in the Sparrows Point area until a four-lane surface freeway was constructed along this portion, with interchanges reconfigured, following an $89.5-million (equivalent to $ in ) project completed in January 2000. The Outer Harbor Crossing, as well as the entire Baltimore Beltway east of I-95, was first signposted as MD 695 because portions of it were a two-lane expressway not up to Interstate Highway standards. Improvements to the road have allowed the entire Baltimore Beltway to be signed as I-695, even though all of I-695 between the junction of I-95 northeast of Baltimore and I-97 is officially considered MD 695 by MDSHA.

On June 8, 1999, a tractor-trailer carrying a backhoe that exceeded the maximum height requirement struck a pedestrian footbridge over the Baltimore Beltway just northwest of the I-95 junction near Arbutus. The footbridge collapsed onto the inner loop of the beltway. One driver was killed when his SUV struck the collapsed bridge; six others were injured, three critically. The incident occurred during the afternoon rush hour. The footbridge had been closed to pedestrians since November 1996 due to complaints about vandalism and crime.

The beltway was dedicated in honor of former Governor Theodore McKeldin in May 2005. McKeldin was responsible for the construction of the beltway and other state highways during his term. Most Marylanders still refer to the highway as the "Baltimore Beltway", "695", or (mostly among Baltimore metro area residents) simply "The Beltway", like its Washington DC counterpart.

In March 2009, construction began on the reconstruction of the bridge that carries MD 139 (Charles Street) over I-695. The bridge will be decorative, featuring ornamental street lights. As part of the MD 139 project, the interchange will be reconstructed and the traffic circle at the MD 139/I-695 ramps will be removed and replaced with a traffic signal. This project was expected to cost $50 million (equivalent to $ in ) and be completed in 2012.

At exit 33 (I-95/John F. Kennedy Memorial Highway), both highways had crossed over themselves so that all through traffic was on the left side of the road with left-hand entrance/exit ramps connecting the crossover sections. This interchange was replaced in 2014 by a more conventional flyover ramp interchange, as part of the I-95 expansion project under construction since 2007, eliminating the left-turn ramps and I-95's double crossovers. The ramp from northbound I-95 to eastbound I-695 was completed in September 2008, the ramp from westbound I-695 to northbound I-95 was completed in October 2008, the ramp from northbound I-95 to westbound I-695 was completed in November 2008 (eliminating the left-hand exit), and the ramp from eastbound I-695 to southbound I-95 was completed in May 2009. The ramps from southbound I-95 to both westbound and eastbound I-695 were completed in June 2009 and the ramp from westbound I-695 to southbound I-695 was completed in July 2009 and the ramp from eastbound I-695 to northbound I-95 opened in August 2009. In addition to rebuilding these ramps, the project also add four ramps to service the HOT lanes being added to I-95.

Future
There are long-term plans to add new lanes to I-695 to ease traffic congestion along the northern and western parts of the route between the two interchanges with I-95. These plans would widen the sections between I-95 and I-70 on the west side and between the Jones Falls Expressway and I-95 on the north side. In addition, there are also plans to add a fourth lane between the ramps to I-795, ending the disappearing fourth lanes in this section. A multiyear project to replace the stack interchange at I-70 would allow at least eight lanes to pass under this interchange upon its estimated completion by 2024. All these projects will enable up to 10 lanes to be constructed at a future date. Also, ramp meters will be installed at selected entrances within the next five years.

Exit list
Exits are numbered sequentially (unlike other Interstates in Maryland which use a milepost-based system) and in a clockwise (inner loop) direction, in accordance with American Association of State Highway and Transportation Officials (AASHTO) guidelines.

Auxiliary routes

Maryland Route 695A (MD 695A) runs along Broening Highway, a two-lane undivided road that begins at I-695 exit 44 and heads northwest through residential and industrial areas in Dundalk, Baltimore County, to the Baltimore city line. The route provides access to the Dundalk Marine Terminal from I-695.
Maryland Route 695B (MD 695B) runs along Belclare Road from MD 695A north to Dundalk Avenue in Dundalk, Baltimore County.
Maryland Route 695C (MD 695C) runs along Authority Drive from MD 695A southwest to I-695 in Dundalk, Baltimore County, looping under the route at the Francis Scott Key Bridge to merge onto northbound I-695. MD 695C serves as part of a U-turn ramp to provide access to MD 695A from southbound I-695 and to provide access to northbound I-695 from MD 695A.

See also

References

External links

I-695 on Kurumi.com
Interstate Guide - I-695
I-695 at MDRoads.com
I-695 at AARoads.com
Maryland Roads - I-695
Baltimore Beltway (I-695) at Steve Anderson's DCroads.net

95-6
95-6 Maryland
695
6 Maryland
Roads in Anne Arundel County, Maryland
Roads in Baltimore County, Maryland
695